Isabel Delgado (born 9 July 1987) is a Mexican synchronized swimmer. She competed in the women's duet at both the 2008 and 2012 Summer Olympics.  In 2008, she competed with Mariana Cifuentes, and in 2012 with Nuria Diosdado.

References 

1987 births
Living people
Mexican synchronized swimmers
Olympic synchronized swimmers of Mexico
Synchronized swimmers at the 2008 Summer Olympics
Synchronized swimmers at the 2012 Summer Olympics
Swimmers from Mexico City
Synchronized swimmers at the 2015 Pan American Games
Synchronized swimmers at the 2011 Pan American Games
Pan American Games medalists in synchronized swimming
Pan American Games silver medalists for Mexico
Central American and Caribbean Games gold medalists for Mexico
Central American and Caribbean Games silver medalists for Mexico
Competitors at the 2006 Central American and Caribbean Games
Central American and Caribbean Games medalists in synchronized swimming
Medalists at the 2015 Pan American Games
20th-century Mexican women
21st-century Mexican women